Francesca da Rimini (1255 – c. 1285) was a medieval Italian noblewoman.

Francesca da Rimini may also refer to:

Art

Painting
Paolo and Francesca da Rimini an 1855 watercolour by Dante Gabriel Rossetti

Orchestral works
 Francesca da Rimini (Tchaikovsky), 1876
 Francesca da Rimini (1889/90), a symphonic poem by Antonio Bazzini
 Francesca da Rimini (1892), a symphonic poem by Arthur Foote
 Francesca da Rimini (1899), a symphonic poem by 
 Paolo e Francesca (1908), the second part of the symphonic poem Dante by Enrique Granados
 Paolo e Francesca (1913), a symphonic poem by Paul von Klenau

Operas
 Francesca da Rimini (1829) by Pietro Generali
 Francesca da Rimini (1877) by Hermann Goetz
 Francesca da Rimini (1914) by Franco Leoni
 Francesca da Rimini (Mercadante), 1831
 Francesca da Rimini (Rachmaninoff), 1904
 Francesca da Rimini (1831) by Giuseppe Staffa
 Francesca da Rimini (1823) by Feliciano Strepponi
 Françoise de Rimini (1882) by Ambroise Thomas
 Francesca da Rimini (Zandonai), 1914

Plays
 Francesca da Rimini by George Henry Boker, 1853
 Francesca da Rimini (play), by Gabriele D'Annunzio, 1901
 Francesca da Rimini, a 1902 play by Francis Marion Crawford

People
 Francesca da Rimini (artist) (fl. from 1984), new media artist